Nippon Kodo is a Japanese incense company who trace their origin back over 400 years to an incense maker known as Koju, who made incense for the Emperor of Japan. The Nippon Kodo Group was established in August 1965, and has acquired several other incense companies worldwide and has offices in New York City, Los Angeles, Paris, Chicago, Hong Kong, Vietnam, and Tokyo. Mainichi-Koh, introduced in 1912, is the company's most popular product.

History
The company traces its roots back over 400 years to Jyuemon Takai, known as Koju, an incense maker to the Emperor of Japan. Founder Tadanori Konaka who was born in Izushi, Hyogo had gone to Osaka, and got a job in Kokando in 1920. He went to Tokyo in 1929. He had established Tokyo Kokando which is the basis of the current of Nippon Kodo, which sells products in the eastern japan region of Kokando. The Nippon Kodo Group was established in August 1965; though it had been in business since 1575. It has acquired several other incense companies worldwide and has offices in Los Angeles, Paris, Chicago, Hong Kong, Vietnam, and Tokyo. The company's name means Japanese incense store.

Brands
Nippon Kodo has several brands of incense, each consisting of several different fragrances. The most popular brand is "Morning Star", whose scents include Sandalwood, Cedar, and vanilla, and which is sold internationally. Other brands include Mainichi-Koh, which is Nippon Kodo's most popular product, introduced in 1912. 
Tokusen Mainichi-Koh, Nippon Kodo's deluxe version of Mainichi-Koh
Seiun, Nippon Kodo's most popular smokeless product
Jinkō Seiun, Nippon Kodo's most popular aloeswood incense
Gozan-kōh, granulated incense used by many temples, often shipped in bulk
Kataribe 
Hanaizumi 
Tendan 
Kafū 
Eiju 
Taiyō 
Seiten 
Kazedayori 
Shibayama 
Setsugekka/Hanamidō 
Dentōdō 
Cafe Time
Esteban
Scentsual
Herb & Earth
Fragrance Memories
Kayuragi
Scentscape
Itten
Naturense

There are 4 incenses in Nippon Kodo's Traditional Series.  These incenses contain ingredients of the Nippon Kodo collection.

Everyday Sandalwood (Mainichi Byakudan） 
Fortune Mountain Agarwood （Jinkō Juzan） 
Diamond Kyara （Kyara Kongō） 
Great Prospects Kyara （Kyara Taikan）

See also
 Japanese Incense Ceremony

References

Japanese incense companies
Manufacturing companies established in 1965
Japanese companies established in 1965